A stuffed toy is a toy doll with an outer fabric sewn from a textile and stuffed with flexible material. They are known by many names, such as plush toys, plushies, stuffed animals, and stuffies; in Britain and Australia, they may also be called soft toys or cuddly toys. The stuffed toy originated from the Steiff company of Germany in the late 19th century and gained popularity following the creation of the teddy bear in the United States in 1903, at the same time the German toy inventor Richard Steiff designed a similar bear. In 1903, Peter Rabbit was the first fictional character to be made into a patented stuffed toy. In the 1970s, London-based Hamleys, the world's oldest toy store, bought the rights to Paddington Bear stuffed toys. In the 1990s, Ty Warner created Beanie Babies, a series of animals stuffed with plastic pellets that were popular as collector's items.

Stuffed toys are made in many different forms, but most resemble real animals (sometimes with exaggerated proportions or features), legendary creatures, cartoon characters, or inanimate objects. They can be commercially or home-produced from numerous materials, most commonly pile textiles like plush for the outer material and synthetic fiber for the stuffing. Often these toys are designed for children, but stuffed toys are popular for a range of ages and uses, and have been marked by fads in popular culture that sometimes affected collectors and the value of the toys.

Description 

Stuffed toys are distinguishable from other toys mainly by their softness, flexibility, and resemblance to animals or fictional characters. Stuffed toys most commonly take the form of animals, especially bears (in the case of teddy bears), mammalian pets such as cats and dogs, and highly recognizable animals such as zebras, tigers, pandas, lizards, and elephants. Many fictional animal-like characters from movies, TV shows, books, or other entertainment forms often appear in stuffed toy versions, as do both real and fictional humans if the individual or character is famous enough. These toys are filled with soft plush material.

Stuffed toys come in an array of different sizes, with the smallest being thumb-sized and the largest being larger than a house. However, the largest somewhat commonly produced stuffed animals are not much bigger than a person. Most stuffed animals are designed to be an appropriate size for easy cuddling. They also come in a wide variety of colors, cloth surfaces, fur textures, and humanizing embellishments.

Stuffed toys are commonly sold in stores worldwide. Vendors are often abundant at tourist attractions, airports, carnivals, fairs, downtown parks, and general public meeting places of almost any nature, especially if there are children present.

History

The first stuffed toy was a felt elephant originally sold as a pincushion, created by the German Steiff company in 1880. Steiff used newly developed technology for manufacturing upholstery to make its stuffed toys. In 1892, the Ithaca Kitty became one of the first mass-produced stuffed animal toys in the United States, which was sold as "The Tabby Cat" printed pattern on muslin by Arnold Print Works.

The toy industry significantly expanded in the early 20th century. In 1903, Richard Steiff designed a soft stuffed bear that differed from earlier traditional rag dolls because it was made of plush furlike fabric. At the same time, in the US, Morris Michtom created the first teddy bear after being inspired by a drawing of President "Teddy" Roosevelt with a bear cub. In 1903, the character Peter Rabbit from English author Beatrix Potter was the first fictional character to be made into a patented stuffed toy. The popularity of stuffed toys grew, with numerous manufacturers forming in Germany, the United Kingdom, and the United States. Many people also handmade their own stuffed toys. For instance, sock monkeys originated when parents turned old socks into toys during the Great Depression.

Stuffed toys of Paddington Bear, a character created by Michael Bond, were first produced by the family of Jeremy Clarkson in 1972, with the family eventually selling the rights to London-based Hamleys, the world's oldest toy store. More recent lines of stuffed animals have been created around unique concepts, like Uglydoll, introduced in 2001, with a number of recognizable characters and overarching style.

Modern plushies from Japan are known for kawaii styles, generally thought of as (at least globally) starting with Sanrio's Hello Kitty, with many popular characters from popular media like Pikachu and Eevee from Pokémon, and characters from stationery company San-X including Rilakkuma and the  characters. There is also a trend of Japanese plushies being shaped like mochi.

Psychology 

Children as well as adults can form connections with their stuffed toys, often sleeping or cuddling with them for comfort. They can be sentimental objects that reduce anxiety around separation, self-esteem, and fear of the night. In 2019 about a third of British adults reported sleeping with soft toys, and almost half had kept their childhood toys.

Production

Stuffed toys are made from a range of materials. The earliest were created from felt, velvet, or mohair and stuffed with straw, horsehair, or sawdust. Following World War II, manufacturers began to adopt more synthetic materials into production, and in 1954, the first teddy bear made from easily washable materials was produced. Modern stuffed toys are commonly constructed of outer fabrics such as plain cloth, pile textiles like plush or terrycloth, or sometimes socks. Common stuffing materials include synthetic fiber, batting, cotton, straw, wood wool, plastic pellets, and beans. Some modern toys incorporate technology to move and interact with the user.

Manufacturers sell two main types of stuffed toys: licensed, which are toys of characters or other licensed properties, or basic, which take the shape of ordinary animals or other non-licensed subjects.

Stuffed toys can also be homemade from numerous types of fabric or yarn. For instance, amigurumi is a traditional Japanese type of knitted or crocheted stuffed toy typically made with an oversized head and undersized extremities to look kawaii ('cute').

Cultural impact, marketing, and collectors 

Stuffed toys are among the most popular toys, especially for children. Their uses include imaginative play, comfort objects, display or collecting, and gifts to both children and adults for occasions such as graduation, illness, condolences, Valentine's Day, Christmas, or birthdays. In 2018, the global market for stuffed toys was estimated to be , with the growth in target consumers expected to drive sales upwards.

Fads

Many stuffed toys have become fads that have boosted the industry overall. Teddy bears were an early fad that quickly grew into a cultural phenomenon. Close to 100 years later, in the 1990s, Ty Warner created Beanie Babies, a series of animals stuffed with plastic pellets. The toys became a fad through marketing strategies that increased demand and encouraged collection. Pillow Pets, which can be folded from a pillow into a stuffed animal, were another successful brand, launching in 2003 and selling more than 30 million toys between 2010 and 2016.

Other recent fads have involved toys paired with technology. Tickle Me Elmo, a laughing and shaking plush toy based on the character Elmo from the Sesame Street television show, was released in 1996 and was soon in demand, with some people buying and reselling the toy for hundreds of dollars. This popularity sparked similar fads, including the robotic talking plush toy Furby released in 1998 and ZhuZhu Pets, a line of robotic plush hamsters released in 2009.

The internet also presented an opportunity for new stuffed toy fads. In 2005, Ganz launched its Webkinz stuffed toys, which each came with a different "Secret Code" that gave access to the Webkinz World website and a virtual version of the toy for online play. Webkinz's success inspired the creation of other stuffed toys containing codes to unlock digital content, such as the former online worlds Disney's Club Penguin and Build-A-Bearville from Build-A-Bear Workshop. In 2013, Disney launched its first collection of Disney Tsum Tsum stuffed toys based on characters from different Disney properties. Inspired by the popular app of the same name, Tsum Tsums were first released in Japan (an example of mochi shaped plushies) before expanding to the United States. More recently, in 2021, Squishmallows have made an appearance as a popular internet fad and collector's item.

See also

List of stuffed toy manufacturers

References

1880 introductions
1880s toys